The Never Ending Tour is the popular name for Bob Dylan's endless touring schedule since June 7, 1988.

Information
The tour started in Stockholm, Sweden at an intimate concert at Berns Salonger. Dylan performed five concerts in England. One of which was at the Roundhouse in London which was a concert especially for the members of the BobDylan.com fan club. Dylan also performed at the Edinburgh Playhouse, the first time he had performed in the city since April 1995.

After completing the 33 date European tour Dylan returned to the United States to perform a summer ballpark tour. He was joined on the tour by Willie Nelson and John Mellencamp. The tour consisted of 31 dates. Dylan performed at Summerfest in Milwaukee and Rothbury Festival in Rothbury, Michigan.

After the summer tour Dylan and the band toured the States again in the fall starting in Seattle. During the fall tour Dylan and his band performed three concerts at several venues during the tour including the Hollywood Palladium, Aragon Ballroom, Wang Theatre and United Palace Theater where the tour ended on November 19.

Opening acts
Willie Nelson (July 1 – July 4, July 8 – August 16)
The Wiyos (July 2 & July 4, July 8 – July 13, August 16)
John Mellencamp (July 2 & July 4, July 8 – August 16)
The Two Man Gentlemen Band (July 10 & 11)
Johnny Rivers (October 13)
John Doe (October 14)
George Thorogood (October 15)
Dion (November 17 – November 19)

Band
Bob Dylan – Vocals, harmonica, organ, guitar
Denny Freeman – Guitar (Until 16 August 2009)
Charlie Sexton – Guitar (From 4 October 2009)
Stu Kimball – Rhythm guitar
George Recelli – Drums, percussion
Tony Garnier – Bass

Tour dates

Cancellations and rescheduled shows

Notes

Set lists

First leg (Europe)
This set list is representative of the performance on April 25, 2009 in London, England. It does not represent all concerts for the duration of the tour.

"Maggie's Farm"
"The Times They Are a-Changin'"
"Things Have Changed"
"Chimes of Freedom"
"Rollin' and Tumblin'"
"The Lonesome Death of Hattie Carroll"
"'Til I Fell in Love with You"  
"Workingman's Blues #2"
"Highway 61 Revisited"
"Ballad of Hollis Brown"
"Po' Boy"
"Honest With Me"
"When the Deal Goes Down"
"Thunder on the Mountain"
"Like a Rolling Stone"
Encore
"All Along the Watchtower"
"Spirit on the Water"
"Blowin' in the Wind"

Second leg (North America)
This set list is representative of the performance on August 4, 2009 in Round Rock, Texas. It does not represent all concerts for the duration of the tour.

"Rainy Day Women ♯12 & 35"
"This Wheel's on Fire"
"The Levee's Gonna Break"
"Spirit on the Water"
"Honest With Me"
"Forgetful Heart"
"Tweedle Dee & Tweedle Dum"
"I Feel a Change Comin' On"
"Highway 61 Revisited"
"Ain't Talkin'"
"Thunder on the Mountain"
Encore
"Like a Rolling Stone"
"Jolene"
"All Along the Watchtower"

Third leg (North America)
This set list is representative of the performance on October 30, 2009 in Chicago, Illinois. It does not represent all concerts for the duration of the tour.

"Leopard-Skin Pill-Box Hat"
"The Man in Me"
"High Water (For Charley Patton)"
"Sugar Baby"
"Rollin' And Tumblin'"
"Every Grain of Sand"
"Cold Irons Bound
"Spirit on the Water"
"Honest With Me"
"Po' Boy"
"Highway 61 Revisited"
"Nettie Moore"
"Thunder on the Mountain"
"Ballad of a Thin Man"
Encore
"Like a Rolling Stone"
"Jolene"
"All Along the Watchtower"

References

External links

BobLinks – Comprehensive log of concerts and set lists
Bjorner's Still on the Road – Information on recording sessions and performances

Bob Dylan concert tours
2009 concert tours
Concerts at Malmö Arena